The Eleventh Commandment is a 1921 play by Brandon Fleming. It premiered at the Playhouse Theatre, Cardiff before transferring to the Royalty Theatre in London's West End where it ran for 32 performances between 16 January and 11 February 1922. The original West End cast included Henry Stoker, Edmund Breon, Dawson Millward and Viola Tree.

Film adaptation
In 1924 it was made into a British silent film of the same title directed by George A. Cooper and starring Fay Compton, Stewart Rome and Lillian Hall-Davis.

References

Bibliography
 Goble, Alan. The Complete Index to Literary Sources in Film. Walter de Gruyter, 1999.
 Wearing, J. P. The London Stage 1920-1929: A Calendar of Productions, Performers, and Personnel. Rowman & Littlefield, 2014.

1921 plays
British plays adapted into films
West End plays
Plays by Brandon Fleming